Evren Çağıran (born 14 February 1993) is a Turkish male compound archer and part of the national team.

Private life
Evren Çağıran was born in Eldivan district of Çankırı Province, Turkey on 14 February 1993. He studied at Aksaray University.

Sport career
Çağıran won the silver medal in the compound team event of the 2014 European Championships held in Echmiadzin, Armenia.

He participated in the team event and individual event at the 2015 World Championships in Copenhagen.

He became champion in the compound individual event at the
third leg of the 2016 World Cup in Antalya, Turkey.

He won the gold medal at the fourth leg of the 2019 World Cup in Berlin, Germany. He took the bronze medal in the mixed team event at the 2019 European Games in Minsk, Belarus.

Çağıran won the gold medal together with his teammates in the second leg of the 2021 World Cup in Lausanne, Switzerland. He and his team mates captured the gold medal at the 2021 European Championships in Antalya, Turkey.

References

External links
 

1993 births
Living people
Sportspeople from Çankırı
People from Eldivan
Aksaray University alumni
Turkish male archers
Archers at the 2019 European Games
European Games medalists in archery
European Games bronze medalists for Turkey
21st-century Turkish people